Fairview is a city located in Williamson County, Tennessee. It is part of the Nashville metropolitan area. The population was 9,357 at the 2020 census, . In the communities just outside Fairview, there are an additional 4,100 people, for a total of over 13,457 people living within the Fairview area.

History 
Fairview was incorporated on July 28, 1959, under the Uniform City Manager-Commission Charter as set out in the Tennessee Code Annotated.

Fairview has two Elementary Schools, Fairview, and Westwood serving over 1,000 students with grades K-5. Fairview Middle has an enrollment of 800 plus and is home to grades 6th-8th. FVHS serves over 1000 students, and Fairview High School was listed as one of the top 1,000 High Schools in the US according to Newsweek Magazine. Fairview schools are part of the Williamson County School system (www.WCS.edu).

It has a recreation center that is part of Williamson County Parks and Recreation system.  The center offers civic meeting rooms, WAVES org, exercise classes, a gym with free weights and machines and a large outdoor swimming pool. There is also a full size basketball court that is open for free play.

Fairview Ball Park has been open since 1982. In the spring and early summer, the youth of Fairview play softball and baseball in the local recreation leagues.  In the fall, the park is home to an adult softball league.  There are four fields located at the park, Field 1 for senior league baseball, Field 2 for tee ball, and softball, Field 3 for age groups up to 12 playing baseball, and Field 4 which is primarily a softball field.

The camp scenes in Ernest Goes to Camp were filmed at Camp Marymount, which is a 340-acre retreat/summer camp owned by the Catholic Church, established in the summer of 1946.

The city is twenty-five miles from downtown Nashville, and is located along State Highway 100 in the NW section of Williamson County.

Geography
Fairview is located at  (35.982071, -87.129133).

Demographics

2020 census

As of the 2020 United States census, there were 9,357 people, 2,962 households, and 2,234 families residing in the city.

2010 census
The 2010 census showed a population increase of 33.1% over the 2000 census with a population of 7,720.  Racial makeup as of the 2010 census was 93.5% White, 2.8% Latino and 1.1% African American.  Median household income in 2010 was $46,088. A special census was conducted in 2015 and reported the city limit population had increased to nearly 10,000.

2000 census
As of the census of 2000, there were 5,800 people, 2,105 households, and 1,606 families residing in the city. The population density was 410.9 people per square mile (158.7/km2). There were 2,245 housing units at an average density of 159.1 per square mile (61.4/km2). The racial makeup of the city was 97.07% White, 0.66% African American, 0.38% Native American, 0.24% Asian, 0.33% from other races, and 1.33% from two or more races. Hispanic or Latino of any race were 1.48% of the population.

There were 2,105 households, out of which 43.7% had children under the age of 18 living with them, 61.0% were married couples living together, 11.9% had a female householder with no husband present, and 23.7% were non-families. 18.8% of all households were made up of individuals, and 6.2% had someone living alone who was 65 years of age or older. The average household size was 2.76 and the average family size was 3.17.

In the city, the population was spread out, with 30.3% under the age of 18, 8.6% from 18 to 24, 34.1% from 25 to 44, 19.7% from 45 to 64, and 7.3% who were 65 years of age or older. The median age was 32 years. For every 100 females, there were 93.3 males. For every 100 females age 18 and over, there were 89.5 males.

The median income for a household in the city was $44,148, and the median income for a family was $49,817. Males had a median income of $36,461 versus $26,277 for females. The per capita income for the city was $20,403. About 5.6% of families and 8.1% of the population were below the poverty line, including 10.2% of those under age 18 and 12.3% of those age 65 or over.

Economy
A Publix supermarket opened in Bowie Commons in 2011.

A Walmart Supercenter store opened in 2014. This is the third Super Walmart to open in Williamson County.

Transportation
Tennessee State Route 100 and Tennessee State Route 96 give Fairview direct access to Interstate 40 and Interstate 840.

References

External links

 City of Fairview
 Municipal Technical Advisory Service entry for Fairview — information on local government, elections, and link to charter
 Bowie Nature Park

Cities in Tennessee
Cities in Williamson County, Tennessee
Populated places established in 1959
Cities in Nashville metropolitan area